Apostolepis assimilis (common name: Reinhardt's burrowing snake) is a species of snake in the family Colubridae. It is found in central and southwestern Brazil, eastern Paraguay, Bolivia, and northern Argentina; the Reptile Database, however, does not mention Bolivia and treats Argentina as uncertain.

References 

assimilis
Colubrids
Reptiles described in 1861
Snakes of South America
Reptiles of Argentina
Reptiles of Bolivia
Reptiles of Brazil
Reptiles of Paraguay
Taxa named by Johannes Theodor Reinhardt